The Forgotten Ten were ten members of the Irish Republican Army who were executed in Mountjoy Prison, Dublin, by British forces following courts martial from 1920 to 1921 during the Irish War of Independence.

Based upon military law at the time, they were buried within the prison precincts, their graves unmarked in the unconsecrated ground.  The names of the Forgotten Ten are Kevin Barry, Thomas Whelan, Patrick Moran, Patrick Doyle, Bernard Ryan, Thomas Bryan, Frank Flood, Thomas Traynor, Edmond Foley, and Patrick Maher. The hangman was John Ellis.

Campaign for reburial
Following the Irish War of Independence, Mountjoy Prison was transferred to the control of the Irish Free State, which became the State of Ireland in 1937. In the 1920s, the families of the dead men requested their remains be returned to them for proper burial. This effort was joined in the later 1920s by the National Graves Association.  Through the efforts of the Association, the graves of the men were identified in 1934, and in 1996 a Celtic cross was erected in Glasnevin Cemetery to commemorate them.

State funeral

The campaign to rebury the men dragged on for 80 years from their deaths. Following an intense period of negotiations, the Irish government relented. Plans to exhume the bodies of the 10 men were announced on 1 November 2000, the 80th anniversary of the execution of Kevin Barry. On 14 October 2001, the Forgotten Ten were afforded full state honours, with a private service at Mountjoy Prison for the families of the dead, a requiem mass at St Mary's Pro-Cathedral and burial in Glasnevin Cemetery.

According to The Guardian, some criticised the event as glorifying militant Irish republicanism. It coincided with the Fianna Fáil party conference. The progress of the cortège through the centre of Dublin was witnessed by crowds estimated as being in the tens of thousands who broke into spontaneous applause as the coffins passed. On O'Connell Street, a lone piper played a lament as the cortege paused outside the General Post Office, the focal point of the 1916 Easter Rising. In his homily during the requiem mass, Cardinal Cahal Daly, a long-time critic of the IRA campaign in Northern Ireland, insisted that there was a clear distinction between the conflict of 1916–22 and the paramilitary-led violence of the previous 30 years:

In his graveside oration the Taoiseach Bertie Ahern echoed these sentiments and also paid tribute to the Ten:

The state funeral, broadcast live on national television and radio, was only the 13th since independence. Patrick Maher would not be reburied with his comrades. In accordance with his wishes, and those of his family, he was reinterred in Ballylanders, County Limerick.

A feature length Irish language documentary on the re-interments, An Deichniúr Dearmadta (The Forgotten Ten) aired on TG4 on 28 March 2002.

Photo gallery

Bibliography
 Carey, Tim: The Forgotten Ten: A Documentary History (2001); 
 O'Donovan, Donal: Barry and his Time'' (1989);

References

See also
 Forgotten Ten from An Phoblacht - Sinn Féin Weekly
 IRA men's bodies to be exhumed from BBC News
 'Forgotten 10' prisoners deserve Christian burial ; Court challenge from findarticles.com
 I Did Penal Servitude by Walter Mahon-Smith (aka D 83222) 1945
 A series of articles on the Forgotten Ten from The Wild Geese Today

1920 deaths
1921 deaths
Burials at Glasnevin Cemetery
Irish Republican Army (1919–1922) members
20th-century executions by the United Kingdom
Irish Republicans killed during the Irish War of Independence
Executed Irish people
People executed by the British military by hanging